Childhood Obesity is a bimonthly peer-reviewed medical journal covering childhood obesity. It was established in 2005 as Obesity Management, and changed its name to Obesity and Weight Management in 2009. It acquired its current name in 2010. It is published by Mary Ann Liebert, Inc. and the editor-in-chief is Tom Baranowski (Baylor College of Medicine). According to the Journal Citation Reports, the journal has a 2018 impact factor of 2.426.

References

External links

Mary Ann Liebert academic journals
Pediatrics journals
Bimonthly journals
Publications established in 2005
English-language journals
Obesity journals